Anthony "Tony" Slonim (born ) is an American author, physician and healthcare executive who was the President and CEO of Renown Health. Slonim was fired for cause from Renown on March 10, 2022 after the Renown Board hired outside counsel to investigate his actions as CEO. Prior to his 2014 appointment at Renown Health, he served as executive vice president and CMO for RWJBarnabas Health. He also held faculty appointments at the Jefferson College of Nursing and Health, the University of Medicine and Dentistry of New Jersey. Slonim is the first quadruple-board-certified doctor in the United States with certifications in adult critical care, internal medicine, pediatric critical care and pediatrics.

Early life and education
Slonim was raised in New Jersey. He attended New York University where he earned bachelor's degrees in economics and psychology. He also holds a medical degree from New York Medical College as well as a master's degree and Doctorate in Administrative Medicine and Health Policy from George Washington University School of Medicine & Health Sciences.

Career
Slonim completed his residency at St. Joseph's Medical Center before completing his fellowship training at the National Institutes of Health (NIH). After completing his fellowship he held a faculty position at Children’s National Medical Center. In 2007 he became the vice president of Medical Affairs at the Carilion Roanoke Memorial Hospital. Slonim served as the CMO of the Shady Grove Adventist Hospital in Rockville, Maryland before joining the New Jersey-based Barnabas Health as a CMO and executive vice president. At Barnabas, Slonim was responsible for overseeing patient care delivery, accountable care initiatives, and information technology.

In May 2014 he was named the CEO and president of Renown Health, where he expanded the organization's affiliations with the University of Nevada, Reno School of Medicine, Stanford University School of Medicine, Stanford Children's Health, and Stanford Health Care, as well as helping to raise funds to launch a pediatric residency program at Renown and raised additional funds for the Child Health Institute.

In 2017 Slonim was appointed editor-in-chief of the American Association for Physician Leadership's bi-monthly Physician Leadership Journal. That same year, Slonim was nominated to Modern Healthcare's 50 Most Influential Physicians Executives and Leaders list. Slonim also co-chairs the Truckee Meadows Healthy Communities Board, serves as a chairman on the American Journal of Managed Care's ACO Coalition and has been appointed to the American Hospital Association's Health Care Systems Council.

In 2019, Slonim was appointed to serve on the Patient Protection Commission created by the Office of Nevada Governor Steve Sisolak. That same year, he was also named one of Becker's Hospital Review's 105 Physician Leaders to Know and was #37 on Modern Healthcare's list of Most Influential Clinical Executives.

In 2022 He has now Started working for a Medical Facility in South Florida Called Complete Local Specialty Care

Personal life
At the age of 38, Slonim was diagnosed with oral cancer, something that he has said offered him a critical perspective about healthcare. He lives in FLorida with his wife, Shiela. He has two children.

Bibliography

References

External links
Anthony Slonim TEDx Talk - Healthcare Reform that Creates Healthier Communities
Anthony Slonim TEDx Talk - How to Improve the Health of a Nation One Community at a Time

1964 births
Living people
American physicians
American writers